From the Beggar's Mantle ... Fringed with Gold is an album by Barbara Dickson.

"The Morning Lies Heavy on Me" by Allan Taylor is a soldier's farewell to his family. Dickson had met the folk singer Daisy Chapman (1912 - 1979) in 1968, and had learned "The Orange and the Blue" directly from her. It is a longer version of the song "All Around My Hat". "Lord Thomas of Winesberry and the King's Daughter" is sustained for 6 minutes with simple fiddle and guitar accompaniment. The album was recorded in 1971 and released on vinyl in 1972. It was re-released in 2006 on CD with Do Right Woman.

Track listing 
Side One
 "Witch of the Westmorland" (Archie Fisher) (4:08)
 "If I Never, Ever Saw You Again" (Archie Fisher) (3:03)
 "Recruited Collier" (Traditional) (2:35)
 "The Morning Lies Heavy On Me" (Allan Taylor) (3:10)
 "Fine Flowers in the Valley" (Traditional) (3:01)
Side Two
 "Lord Thomas of Winesberry and the King's Daughter" (Traditional; arranged by Archie Fisher) (6:02)
 "The Climb" (Archie Fisher) (3:16)
 "The Orange and the Blue" (Traditional) (3:38)
 "Winter's Song" (Alan Hull) (4:32)

Personnel 
Barbara Dickson - vocals
Nic Jones - fiddle, guitar
Archie Fisher - guitar, concertina
Daryl Runswick - bass, piano
Bill DeMont - cello
Technical
Derek Varnals - engineer

References 

Barbara Dickson albums
1972 albums
Decca Records albums